Kuveni(කුවේණි / குவேணி) also known as Sesapathi or Kuvanna or Leelawathi, was a Yakshini queen in Sri Lanka mentioned in the ancient Pali chronicles Mahavansa and Dipavansa of the Sinhalese people. The primary source for her life-story is the Mahavansa. She is venerated as Maha Loku Kiriammaleththo by the Veddas. Other names for her varying with Veddas habitats are Indigolle Kiriamma, Unapane Kiriamma, Kande Kiriamma, Divas Kiriamma, Wellasse Kiriamma, Kukulapola Kiriamma and Bili Kiriamma.

Kuveni was a wife of Sri Lanka's first recorded king Vijaya and she had two children, a son named Jeevahatta and the daughter as Disala. According to the genesis myth of the Sinhalese people, recorded in the Mahavansa, the Veddas - Sri Lanka aboriginal population are descended from Kuveni's children. Kuveni, on the other hand, is regarded as a descendant of the Rakshas of the Ramayana and of Ravana, who also dwelled in Lanka.

According to Dayananda Binaragama another prevalent legend about Kuveni among the Veddas is that she is the elder sister of deity Saman. For the Veddas, Devas too were and are another living tribe.

Legend
According to the Mahavamsa, Vijaya's arrival in Sri Lanka is said to have coincided with the passing away of the Buddha. Indeed, the very first 'person' that Vijaya supposedly encounters on the island is the God Sumana Saman, who is charged by the ailing Buddha with looking after Vijaya and his descendants.

When Prince Vijaya landed on Tambapanni (5th century BC) with his seven hundred followers, they saw a dog. Vijaya's men, surmising that 'Only where there is a village are dogs to be found', followed the creature, only to come upon the Queen of the Yakkhas, Kuveni. Though the protection of Suman Saman prevented Kuveni from devouring the hapless man, it did not prevent her from hurling him - and all of Vijaya's other companions - into a chasm.

Vijaya eventually comes upon Kuveni and threatens her with death unless she releases his men. When this is done, Kuveni supplies them with food and clothing, and, 'assuming the lovely form of a sixteen year old maiden' seduces Vijaya.  Then, in a complete reversal of her allegiances, she states that she 'will bestow Kingship on my Lord (Vijaya)' and thus 'all the Yakkhas must be slain, for (else) the Yakkhas will slay me, for it was through me that men have taken up their dwelling (in Lanka)'. This Vijaya goes on to do, vanquishing the Yakkhas and driving them from the island, all the time with Kuveni at his side.

Though Kuveni bears him two children,  a son and a daughter, Vijaya eventually rejects her with the words 'Go now, dear one, leaving the two children behind; men are ever in fear of superhuman beings'. Despite begging Vijaya not to send her away, a broken-hearted Kuveni eventually leaves the palace, taking the two children despite being ordered not to. Kuveni was killed by her relatives  when she went back to them to ask for help, leaving the two children in the forest glades of Bambawa of the North West region in Sri Lanka. And when the mother did not return they trekked towards Sabaragamuwa.

And alternative tale is that Kuveni flung herself from Yakdessa Gala, imploring the Gods to curse Vijaya for his cruelty - which they do by preventing any of Vijaya's children from ever sitting on the throne of Rajarata.  'Vijaya's curse' is held by some to still hold sway over Sri Lanka's troubled politics.

Palace of Kuveni
Ruins of the palace of Kuveni can be found inside Wilpattu National Park Sri Lanka.

See also
List of monarchs of Sri Lanka
Mahavamsa
History of Sri Lanka
Place names in Sri Lanka
 Vedda people

References

Sources
 The curse and sublimation of Kuveni
 The first battle for freedom

Pre Anuradhapura period
Yakshas